Myrick is an unincorporated community in Lafayette County, in the U.S. state of Missouri.

Myrick has the name of a railroad employee.

References

Unincorporated communities in Lafayette County, Missouri
Unincorporated communities in Missouri